Magnus "Mac" Freiherr von Braun (10 May 1919 – 21 June 2003) was a German chemical engineer, Luftwaffe aviator, rocket scientist and business executive. In his 20s he worked as a rocket scientist at Peenemünde and the Mittelwerk.

At age 26, he emigrated to the United States via Operation Paperclip, where he worked for some years at Fort Bliss. In 1955 he began a career as a senior executive with Chrysler's missile and later automotive divisions, retiring in 1975. He lived for 58 years partially in the United States and partially in the United Kingdom until his death. He was the brother of Sigismund and Wernher von Braun.

Biography
Von Braun was born in Greifswald, Pomerania, to Magnus Freiherr von Braun and Emmy von Quistorp. After completing boarding school at Hermann Lietz-Schule in Spiekeroog, he began his studies in 1937 at Technische Universität München. There he remained after receiving his master's degree in organic chemistry, and became an assistant to Nobel laureate Hans Fischer.

Von Braun arrived at Peenemünde in July 1943 at the request of Wernher von Braun.  In March 1944 he was arrested with fellow rocket specialists Wernher von Braun, Klaus Riedel, Helmut Gröttrup, and Hannes Lüersen, but was later released.  In late summer 1944 he transferred to the Mittelwerk where he engineered V-2 rocket gyroscopes, servomotors, and turbopumps.

The Mittelwerk was an underground munitions factory dug into Germany's Harz Mountains in order to avoid aerial bombardment by British and American planes. It consisted of two tunnels bored through the mountain range near the town of Nordhausen, each a mile long and connected by dozens of cross tunnels. Railways laid through the main tunnels brought raw materials in and finished rockets out. The entire cavity provided some 35 million cubic feet of space. After massive Allied bombing disrupted the original V-2 development center in the Baltic town of Peenemünde in mid-1943, the majority of German rocket production was moved to the Mittelwerk. Prisoners from the nearby Mittelbau-Dora concentration camps provided slave labor for this huge endeavor. Inmates were marched into the tunnels daily and compelled to work by the notorious Nazi SS, who handled all security issues. The usual horrific methods were employed and over 20,000 slaves perished during this subterranean rocket factory's existence.

Magnus von Braun's involvement with the Mittelwerk began in the fall of 1944, soon after full production began. The first V-2s produced earlier that year had a high failure rate and sabotage was suspected. Concern about these problems prompted Wernher, who was still based at Peenemünde, to send his younger brother to the Mittelwerk in September. While some minor sabotage did occur in the tunnels, it was relatively rare. The real reason for the poor quality of early Mittelwerk missiles was the effort to take cutting-edge research technology and put it into mass production under slave labor conditions.

Tossed into this brutal environment, Magnus reported directly to the factory's chief of rocket production, Arthur Rudolph, who had an office in one of the main tunnels. This work connection with Rudolph would span decades and continents. After Germany surrendered in 1945, Rudolph was part of a group of Nazi scientists who emigrated with the von Braun brothers to the United States as part of Operation Paperclip. The U.S. Army put them to work in New Mexico developing intercontinental ballistic missiles. Moving on to NASA in the 1960s, Rudolph continued to collaborate with Magnus, who by then was employed by the main contractor for the Saturn V lunar rocket, Chrysler Corporation.  As Nasa's project director for the Saturn V, Rudolph was publicly acclaimed after the moon landing, but towards the end of his life, his wartime complicity in using slave labor at the Mittelwerk became more widely known. These revelations then forced Rudolph to make a 1983 deal with the U.S. Justice Department in which he voluntarily relinquished his U.S. citizenship to avoid prosecution and possible loss of his government pension and Social Security benefits. Rudolph then returned to Germany, where he died in 1996.

In November 1944, Rudolph put Magnus in charge of rocket fin servomotors, which were the most troublesome V-2 component at that time. During this period, concerns over sabotage were at their height. In a notorious incident that winter, several Russian prisoners suspected of sabotage were executed by being hanged from cranes used to lift rocket parts and left dangling for a full work day, as an example to other inmates. In this tense atmosphere, servomotors were at the heart of two abuse accusations leveled against Wernher von Braun by Mittelwerk prisoners after the war, one that may have actually involved Magnus. Michael Neufeld, a Smithsonian historian and author of a 2007 biography of Wernher, has tried to unravel claims by Dora prisoners that they personally witnessed brutality administered by the more famous von Braun brother. In a 2002 article about Wernher's potential culpability in Nazi slave labor at Mittelwerk and several other locations, Neufeld dismissed most claims that von Braun carried out direct sadistic behavior as spurious, easily disproved by tracking his known locations during the war. However, Neufeld felt that there were two accusations in particular that merited further study, the second of which might have involved Magnus. "[R]eports that [Wernher] von Braun attended hangings, ordered hangings, attended hangings in SS uniform, etc., have scarcely been discussed in the literature because such testimonies lack credibility," Neufeld wrote. "But in recent years I have received two reports from French Dora survivors that deserve more consideration." In the first incident, survivor Georges Jouanin, whose job was to climb into upright tail sections of V-2s to install cables to the servomotor, placed a wood shoe on one of the units. He later recorded that "someone has noticed my wooden-heeled clog atop such a fragile organ, and I feel a hand pulling insistently on the end of my striped pants, thus forcing me out of the tail unit. 'You, out of here, man, you're committing sabotage. You shouldn't step with your foot on this.' I get slapped in the face twice and my head bounces against the metal panels of the tail unit. Cap in hand, I find myself in front of a man in his 30s, rather well dressed, angry, to who I am not allowed to give an explanation. The seven or eight engineers or technicians in the group of which he came out seem disconcerted, astonished... I went back to my work space and the incident seemed over, without consequences. My civilian foreman, Manger is his name, returns from break and tells me ... 'Our big boss boxed your ears! That was V. Braun.'"

In the second case, an inmate named Guy Morand testified that while testing rocket servomotors, he tried to cover for another prisoner who had mislaid a chronometer, which brought the wrath of an enraged foreman down upon him. "Like the good Nazi he was," Morand remembered, "he immediately started shouting it was sabotage, when just at that point von Braun arrived accompanied by his usual group of people. Without even listening to my explanations, he ordered the Meister to have me given 25 strokes in his presence by an SS [man] who was there. Then, judging that the strokes weren't sufficiently hard, he ordered that I be flogged more vigorously, and this order was then diligently carried out." Morand went on to say that "following the floggings, von Braun made me translate that I deserved much more, that in fact I deserved to be hanged, which certainly would be the fate of the 'Mensch' (good-for-nothing) I was." Morand adds that the man was "one of the inventors of the V-2" and frequently made "rapid inspections" of his work area.

This description of "von Braun" is closer to Magnus in his role at the rocket factory than that of Wernher, who visited only occasionally. Neufeld raises the possibility of an identity error in Morand's recollections: "In September 1944, Wernher assigned his younger brother Magnus, a chemical engineer and Luftwaffe pilot, as his special liaison to the Mittelwerk, particularly for servomotor production, which was afflicted with serious technical problems. Magnus von Braun stayed in the Nordhausen area full-time until the evacuation of April, 1945. In contrast, his older brother visited the Mittelwerk, by his estimates, twelve or fifteen times in total. Morand gives the time of the incident as the 'second half of 1944,' which corresponds to Magnus von Braun's assignment to the factory, and the testimonial never actually gives 'von Braun' a last name."

In a footnote to this same 2002 article, Neufeld refers to another incident on the record. A Dora survivor named Robert Cazabonne reported "that a fellow prisoner witnessing a hanging in the tunnel pointed out one of the German onlookers and said, 'That's VON BRAUN!'" Neufeld concludes, "We know with near certainty that Wernher von Braun was not there; however, it might have been his brother Magnus, as civilian employees were expected to attend."

Neufeld continues, "Morand's story necessarily brings Jouanin's identification into question, as both deal with servomotors. Although Jouanin's first instinct on timing was early May 1944, when I wrote him about it, he was less than certain. The description of a man in his thirties he saw only once fits Wernher von Braun better than Magnus, however. In the end, it is impossible to say with certainty that Georges Jouanin's identification of Wernher von Braun can be accepted as meeting a reasonable standard of certainty, as believable as I find it personally. Nor can we conclude with assurance that Magnus von Braun was responsible ..."

These prisoner recollections of a sadistic scientist named von Braun stalking the Mittelwerk tunnels, especially on occasions when it can be shown that Wernher could not have been there, is not final proof of Magnus's guilt. However, the possibility of the younger brother's involvement in such abuse requires consideration of an unpleasant facet of his personality that was documented in postwar U.S. Army files kept on all former Nazi scientists who worked in the United States.

Magnus was born nearly a decade after his two older brothers, who had come of age before the Nazis took power in Germany. Unlike them, Magnus had a National Socialist adolescence. While the older brothers can be seen as having joined the Nazi party for reasons of professional advancement, Magnus signed on to fascism at a point in life before such concerns became important. His was an ideological commitment. He was thirteen when Hitler became chancellor and thus participated in the Hitler Youth organization and experienced a secondary school environment and curriculum adapted to fascism. His politicized early years naturally influenced his character. Even after the war, Magnus stood apart from Wernher by his displays of arrogance and aristocratic pretension, duly noted by the Army officers who kept files on both men after their 1945 immigration to the United States. Sigismund, the eldest brother, became a diplomatic attaché for the German government in 1936 and passed his war years in Vatican City on consular duty. Though a Nazi party member like his brothers, he avoided direct complicity with regime atrocities such as slave labor and was able to join the new West German foreign service after the war. He rose to become a notable diplomat for West Germany during the 1960s and 1970s.

Surrender at Reutte

After evacuating from Nordhausen, Magnus von Braun was at the Behelfsheim in Weilheim when Wernher von Braun arrived there from Oberammergau on 14 April 1945.  The next day, Magnus had arrived at the Haus Ingeborg in Oberjoch by the end of the day. When Huzel became von Braun's assistant, Dr. Kurt Debus became Engineer in Charge of Test Stand VII—Huzel had served since May 1944 after replacing his old friend Hartmut Kuechen. The Mittelwerk was designated for production after the 17 August 1943 Operation Hydra bombing of Peenemünde, and production started well afterward, so Magnus von Braun's claim that he was selected to transfer in October 1943 is inaccurate.  After hearing the radio report of Hitler's death, Wernher von Braun announced to his group early in the morning of 3 May 1945 that "Magnus, who speaks English, has just left by bicycle to establish contact with the American forces at Reutte.  We cannot wait here forever."  "It was quite courageous for Magnus to come down on his bicycle and find the American troops," said Dr. Ernst Stuhlinger,  member of the V-2 team. "He had a white handkerchief tied to the handlebars of the bicycle and that was all he had to protect him."

About two in the afternoon, Magnus returned, "I think it went well, I have safe conduct passes and they want us for further interrogation." The Mission Accomplished: The Battle History of the 44th Infantry Division claim that there was a "hectic night of interrogation, plans and counter-proposals" after Magnus von Braun rode his bike downhill in the morning and met members of the "Anti-tank Company, 324th Infantry" "before he went out and in a short time returned with his brother" is inaccurate: Huzel, McGovern, & Ordway, in their researched works, distinctly state Magnus returned about 2 in the afternoon the same day.

Dieter Huzel described the surrender of the group: "Thus, in the dull, rainy, late afternoon of Wednesday, May 2, 1945, seven men [Magnus & Wernher, Walter Dornberger, Axster, Huzel, Lindenberg, & Tessman] ... began their lonely descent from Adolf Hitler Pass toward ... Schattwald. ... Suddenly, around a curve, an American soldier ... waved us to a stop.  Magnus got out and showed a piece of paper to the guard ... After about a half an hour, ... we were flanked by two ..."jeeps,"... We reached Reutte after dark.  ... The next morning ... we emerged from the mess hall ... several Army photographers were on hand and spent some time taking pictures." During a photo shoot the next day, Magnus von Braun commented "We're celebrating now, but I'll bet they will throw telephone books at us if we ever reach New York.  By noon, Magnus von Braun (along with Axster, Huzel, Lindenberg, & Tessman) arrived in Peiting where forty other Peenemünde personnel already had arrived, and the Germans departed for Garmisch-Partenkirchen on 8 May.

Operation Paperclip and work at Fort Bliss
Von Braun arrived in New York on 16 November 1945 aboard the SS Argentina and was soon at work at Fort Bliss, Texas and later at Redstone Arsenal in Huntsville, Alabama.  Von Braun was interrogated as a witness for the Andrae war crimes trial in which Mittelwerk general manager Georg Rickhey was acquitted.  Fort Bliss Army CIC agents believed he was a "dangerous German Nazi", with one agent remarking, "his type is a worse threat to security than a half a dozen discredited SS Generals." Soon after his arrival, he was caught trying to sell a brick of platinum he'd stolen from the base to a jeweler in El Paso. The incident was quickly hushed up, though he was informally punished by means of a terrible beating given by his brother Wernher the politician.

Career with Chrysler
In 1955, von Braun began a career with Chrysler—first in the missile division and then in the automotive division. He also resided in Huntsville, Alabama, for a while before moving to Michigan.  After living in Michigan, he relocated to the UK, working in London and Coventry as Chrysler UK export director.  Von Braun retired from Chrysler in 1975 and returned to the States, where he settled in Arizona and resided until his death.

References

1919 births
2003 deaths
People from Greifswald
American Lutherans
Early spaceflight scientists
German aerospace engineers
German chemical engineers
20th-century German chemists
German emigrants to the United States
German Lutherans
Barons of Germany
V-weapons people
People from the Province of Pomerania
German rocket scientists
Technical University of Munich alumni
Operation Paperclip
Wernher von Braun
Engineers from Mecklenburg-Western Pomerania